Glória e Vera Cruz is a civil parish in the municipality of Aveiro, in the central Portuguese district of Aveiro.

History
Since the Christian Reconquista and reorganization of the church between the Douro and Mondego Rivers, the settlements of Aveiro were constituted in one parish, whose seat was the Church of São Miguel. Constructed at the end of the 9th century, under the initiative of D. Sisnando, Count of Coimbra and vassal of D. Fernando Magno, King of Leon, the first building was erected on a hill where a fortification and mosque had likely existed. Overlooking the sea, which entered and formed a long bay with several arms the incipient "Alavário" was an outpost of the Conimbricense facing the north. Surrounding it, in the middle of the 10th century, the Countess Mumadona Dias had lands and saltworks, which she donated to the Monastery of Guimarães by 26 January 959.

In the 16th century, the region of Aveiro was part of the Diocese de Coimbra, and extended north to the River Antuã that followed the Cambra, from Oliveira de Azeméis and Estarreja. During this time, bishop D. João Soares wanted to visit the parishes within his dominion and to prepare for his visit, ordered a census of the population in each. This study determined a population in Aveiro in 1572 of 11365 practicing Christians. The bishop realized that this number was an excessive population and determined to divide the main settlement into four parishes. Since the Church of São Miguel was the dominion of the Order of São Bento de Aviz, this division could not be possible without consulting with the king, who was the Grand-Master of the Order. Yet, this was a simple matter, since King D. Sebastian granted the bishop his writ. The prelate, by provision on 10 June 1572, parceled out the territory into the following parishes: São Miguel, that included most of the walled town and the barrio of Alboi (to the west); Espírito Santo, that included the Convent of São Domingos, Convent of Jesus and Convent of Santo António, which extended to the south and encompassed Cimo da Vila, Vilar, São Bernardo, Santiago and part of Presa and Quinta do Gato; Nossa Senhora das Candeias (or alternately Nossa Senhora da Apresentação) and Vera Cruz, to the north of the central channel. The parish of Apresentação included most of the Ria from the town to the central channel of Ovar (São Jacinto) and Vera Cruz included the limits that befell the Convent of Carmo and Convent of Sá, and extended  to Presa and Quinta do Gato. Following the division, the parish of São Miguel included a population of 4500 inhabitants, while the other parishes each had 2500.

At the beginning of the 19th century, the older divisions were reformed into districts in 1822, in order to establish administrative, judicial, political and civil control. The 1826 constitution maintained the project, but the 1833 reforms divided the national territory into eight provinces, with the comarca of Aveiro falling into the province of Douro. Yet, these divisions were inconvenient, owing to their extensive territories, and they were abolished in favour of a district and municipal system: on 18 July 1835, a decree was published to institute 10 district capitals. Following this, the district of Aveiro under the stewardship of José Joaquim Lopes de Lima (its first Civil Governor) reduced the number of parishes to two on 11 October 1835: to the north of the central Ria, Vera-Cruz and, to the south, Nossa Senhora da Glória. The barrio of Sã was incorporated into Vera-Cruz. Of the other parishes, Nossa Senhora da Apresentação was extinguished, São Miguel and Espírito Santo were incorporated into the new Nossa Senhora da Glória parish.

The parochial church of Vera-Cruz continued to be the centre of the settlement, in the actual Largo Capitão Maia Magalhães; only decades later would their be interest in constructing a new church, but was demolished before being completed in 1945. The religious centre was transferred temporarily to the Church of Nossa Senhora da Apresentação, but remained the centre thereafter. Meanwhile, in the south, the parish was named "Nossa Senhora da Glória", likely to honor Queen D. Maria da Glória, and was the seat of the extinct Dominican Convent of Nossa Senhora da Misericórdia. Meanwhile, the Church of São Miguel was sacrificed and demolished. The Civil Governor, petitioned by certain political forces, ordered its destruction in order that the people would have fewer remembrances of their former-Absolutist monarch; it was demolished in October 1835, a few days after the parish was extinguished. On 18 October (the day before the event) a procession ran through the burgh with the principal images to their resting place in the Church of São Domingos. The act was preceded by a sermon where the orator sought to demonstrate that the church's destruction was not ordered in hate or scorn, and encouraged those present to accompany the cortege, and conform themselves to the authorities, progress and desires of the peoples of Aveiro. Regardless, there was sobbing and occasional cries from the witnesses during the speech and demolition. In comparison, the Church of Espírito Santo, in the Largo Luís de Camões, was considered inutil and abandoned; it came as no surprise that in its state of ruin it was finally desecrated on 31 January 1836. As the images were also transported by procession to their final place in the church nearby. Following worries about its conservation, the municipal council of Aveiro, in accordance with the parish council ordered its demolish on 10 February 1858. The materials were then reused to construct the tower of the church of Nossa Senhora da Glória. So that the October decision was legal and to facilitate the transition, the bishop of Aveiro ordered the passing of a new provision on 7 March 1836. It declared and validated that Father Manuel Rodrigues Tavares de Araújo Taborda would be named the parish priest of the parish of Vera-Cruz, owing to his 36-year ecclesiastical service to the extinguish parish of Nossa Senhora da Apresentação. Similarly, it conferred on Father António Dias Ladeira de Castro the status of parish priest for Nossa Senhora da Glória owing to his seven-year service at the Church of São Miguel.

In 2013, following the National administrative reform initiative, the two civil parishes were integrated into one agglomeration, representing the primary urban centre of the city of Aveiro, with its seat in Vera-Cruz.

References

Freguesias of Aveiro, Portugal